Neudorf bei Parndorf is a village in the district of Neusiedl am See in the Austrian state of Burgenland.

Population

Personalities
Simon Knéfacz and Mátyás Laáb, Burgenland Croatian writers.

References

Cities and towns in Neusiedl am See District